Gamma Sigma Epsilon is an honor society in the field of Chemistry. It was founded at Davidson College on December 19, 1919.

History
Gamma Sigma Epsilon was founded at Davidson College on December 19, 1919 by Louis P. Good, Manley A Siske and Malcolm R. Doubles. The second and third chapters were at North Carolina State College on February 14, 1921 and University of Florida on December 16, 1921. In 1925 Gamma Sigma Epsilon had five chapters.

In 1931 the Fraternity went co-ed and became an honor society.

Gamma Sigma Epsilon has about 80 active chapters in 25 states and has inducted over 16,000 members.

Chapters
The chapters of Gamma Sigma Epsilon

References

Honor societies
Student organizations established in 1919
1919 establishments in North Carolina